Zwilling may refer to:

People
David Zwilling (born 1949), Austrian alpine skier
Dutch Zwilling (Edward Harrison Zwilling) (1888-1978), American professional baseball player
Gabriel Zwilling (c. 1487-1558), German Lutheran and Protestant Reformer
Martin Zwilling (born 1945), American business executive

Military equipment
 12.8 cm FlaK 40, a German-made World War II anti-aircraft gun with a 'twin' variant
 Heinkel He 111Z "Zwilling", 'twin' variant of a German World War II airplane
 Bf 109Z "Zwilling", an experimental German aircraft from World War II
 MG 81 machine gun, a German-made World War II machine gun with a 'twin' variant
 Z/FlAK 85, a modern Austrian anti-aircraft gun with twin barrels
 Flakpanzer IV mit 3.7 cm FlaK Zwilling, a German-made World War II mobile anti-aircraft gun with two barrels

Other
 Zwilling J. A. Henckels, a knife manufacturer based in Solingen
 Professors Zwillinge, a series of books from the 1920s by German writer Else Ury
 Zwilling, the second album by Eric Fish
 Zwillinge (Locomotives), a class of small narrow gauge paired locomotives built in Germany in the late 19th and early 20th century